Okno Magazine ( "Окно", literally "Window") is one of the Russia's leading literary magazines, which was founded in 1923 in Paris by Mikhail Tsetlin, the Russian émigré writer. Three paper-based issues were published in 1923 and in 1924. In 2007 Okno was re-established as a web-only magazine of poetry in Russian. It publishes Russian poetry, including prose poems and visual texts, translations of poetry from other languages into Russian, as well as literary heritage and essays/articles on poetry. Since autumn 2010 Okno has also been publishing fiction, e.g. novellas, short stories and fragments of novels. The magazine is currently edited by Anatoly Kudryavitsky, a distant relative of Mikhail Tsetlin, and has some well-established poets, e.g. Konstantin Kedrov, Sergey Biryukov and Elena Katsuba, on the editorial board. Dmitri Bavilsky, the prominent Russian novelist and critic, joined the editorial team as the fiction editor in summer 2010.

References

External links
 Okno Magazine

Magazines established in 1923
Magazines disestablished in 1924
Magazines established in 2007
Magazines published in Paris
Online magazines with defunct print editions
Poetry literary magazines
Russian-language magazines
Literary magazines published in Russia
Russian literature websites